Claude Melnotte Hunt (6 December 1887 – 26 February 1959) was an Australian rules footballer who played with St Kilda in the Victorian Football League (VFL).

Notes

External links 

1887 births
1959 deaths
Australian rules footballers from Victoria (Australia)
St Kilda Football Club players